The 15th is a song from the 1979 album 154 by the English rock band Wire, written by Colin Newman.

Fischerspooner cover 

The electroclash band Fischerspooner covered "The 15th" as the second single from its 2001 debut album #1. It was also covered by Jay Reatard's Angry Angles project.

References 

Wire (band) songs
1979 singles
1979 songs
Harvest Records singles